Francis Leo Braganza  (29 January 1922 – 21 December 2011) was an Indian Jesuit priest. He was the bishop of the diocese of Baroda, Gujarat, from 1987 to 1997.

Francis Braganza was born in Mumbai, India, ordained a priest on 21 November 1951 in the Society of Jesus.  Braganza was appointed bishop to the Diocese of Baroda on 27 April 1987 and ordained bishop 29 June 1987. Braganza retired on 29 August 1997.
He lived in Ahmedabad, Gujarat, India, where he died in 2011, aged 89.

See also
Diocese of Baroda
Society of Jesus

External links
Catholic-Hierarchy

1922 births
2011 deaths
20th-century Indian Jesuits
Christian clergy from Mumbai
20th-century Roman Catholic bishops in India